Erich Gamma is a Swiss computer scientist and one of the four co-authors (referred to as "Gang of Four") of the software engineering textbook, Design Patterns: Elements of Reusable Object-Oriented Software.

He also led the design of the Eclipse platform's Java Development Tools (JDT), and worked on the IBM Rational Jazz project.

In 2011 he joined the Microsoft Visual Studio team and leads a development lab in Zürich, Switzerland that has developed the "Monaco" suite of components for browser-based development, found in products such as Azure DevOps Services (formerly Visual Studio Team Services and Visual Studio Online), Visual Studio Code, Azure Mobile Services, Azure Web Sites, and the Office 365 Development tools.

References

External links
 GitHub account
 

Swiss writers
Living people
Swiss computer scientists
Eclipse (software)
IBM employees
Microsoft technical fellows
Software testing people
Industry and corporate fellows
Scientists from Zürich
Year of birth missing (living people)